Program stream (PS or MPEG-PS) is a container format for multiplexing digital audio, video and more.  The PS format is specified in MPEG-1 Part 1 (ISO/IEC 11172-1) and MPEG-2 Part 1, Systems (ISO/IEC standard 13818-1/ITU-T H.222.0). The MPEG-2 Program Stream is analogous and similar to ISO/IEC 11172 Systems layer and it is forward compatible.

Program streams are used on DVD-Video discs and HD DVD video discs, but with some restrictions and extensions. The filename extensions are VOB and EVO respectively.

Coding structure
Program streams are created by combining one or more Packetized Elementary Streams (PES), which have a common time base, into a single stream.  It is designed for reasonably reliable media such as disks, in contrast to MPEG transport stream which is for data transmission in which loss of data is likely.  Program streams have variable size records and minimal use of start codes which would make over the air reception difficult, but has less overhead. Program stream coding layer allows only one program of one or more elementary streams to be packaged into a single stream, in contrast to transport stream, which allows multiple programs.

MPEG-2 Program stream can contain MPEG-1 Part 2 video, MPEG-2 Part 2 video, MPEG-1 Part 3 audio (MP3, MP2, MP1) or MPEG-2 Part 3 audio. It can also contain MPEG-4 Part 2 video, MPEG-2 Part 7 audio (AAC) or MPEG-4 Part 3 (AAC) audio, but they are rarely used. The MPEG-2 Program stream has provisions for non-standard data (e.g. AC-3 audio or subtitles) in the form of so-called private streams. International Organization for Standardization authorized SMPTE Registration Authority, LLC as the registration authority for MPEG-2 format identifiers. It publishes a list of compression formats which can be encapsulated in MPEG-2 transport stream and program stream.

Coding details

See also
Elementary stream
MPEG transport stream

References

External links
 MPEG-2
 Official MPEG web site
 BBC On MPEG
 RFC 3555 - MIME Type Registration of RTP Payload Formats (video/MP2P, video/MP1S)

Digital container formats
MPEG
MPEG-2
ITU-T recommendations